Nic Balthazar (born 24 July 1964 in Ghent) is a Belgian film director and a TV/radio personality (presenter, reporter, producer).

Family 
Balthasar was born into a Ghent family of politicians active in the Socialistische Partij Anders.

Career 
His first movie, Ben X (not to be confused with Ben 10), came out in 2007 and has received critical acclaim. The next feature film which Balthazar directed, Tot Altijd, was released in January 2012.

In Flanders he is well known as a movie critic and television presenter.

Filmography

Awards and nominations

Television/radio

Presenter
Memphis
Ziggurat
Open doek
Mollen en kruisen
Leuven Centraal
Dood doet leven - Radio 1
filminformation - Studio Brussel
Levende Lijven (talkshows)
Filmfan - Canvas
Vlaanderen Vakantieland - Eén

Appearances
Boeketje Vlaanderen (1984) - BRT
Koste wat het kost (1997)
Het swingpaleis (1997–1998) (Eén)
Vlaanderen vakantieland (2003) - Eén
Fata Morgana (2006) - Eén
Tour 2008 - Eén
Masterchef (2010) - Vtm
De jaren stillekes (2010) - Eén

References

External links (further sources)

 
 Nic Balthazar on facebook
 Ben X (First Movie)

Belgian film directors
Living people
1964 births